Gawęda is a Polish-language surname, a variant is Gawenda. The primary meaning of the word is a social chat or tale, and the surname originated from the nickname for a person who likes to talk much, to chat, or who tells tales.

Notable people with this surname include:

 (born 1967), Polish  mining engineer, politician and statesman
 (1896-1979), Polish highly decorated soldier
Dominika Gawęda, lead singer of Polish band Blue Café
 (1914-1994), polish historian, educator and highly decorated soldier

References

Polish-language surnames